The 2007–08 season in the Honduran Liga Nacional was the 42nd season in the top fight in Honduran football; it ran from August 2007 to May 2008. The season was split into two tournaments (Apertura and Clausura) which defined the 51st and 52nd national champions in the history of the league. C.D. Marathón and Club Deportivo Olimpia as winners of each tournament qualified to the 2008–09 CONCACAF Champions League.

2007–08 teams
Deportes Savio from Santa Rosa de Copán was promoted from the 2006–07 Liga de Ascenso.

 Atlético Olanchano
 Deportes Savio
 Hispano F.C.
 C.D. Marathón
 C.D. Motagua
 C.D. Olimpia
 C.D. Platense
 Real C.D. España
 C.D. Victoria
 C.D.S. Vida

Apertura
The Apertura tournament was played from 11 August to 22 December 2007. C.D. Marathón captured its 6th domestic league.

Regular season

Standings

Results
 As of 25 November 2007

Final round

Semifinals

Marathón vs Olimpia

 Marathón 2–2 Olimpia on aggregate score; Marathón advanced on better regular season performance.

Motagua vs Victoria

 Motagua won 3–1 on aggregate score.

Final

Marathón vs Motagua

 Marathón won 2–0 on aggregate score.

Top goalscorers
 As of 22 December 2007
10 goals
  Emil Martínez (Marathón)
7 goals
  Mitchel Brown (Marathón)
  Abidán Solís (Victoria)
6 goals
  Amado Guevara (Motagua)
  Luis Rodas (Motagua)
5 goals

  Edilson Pereira (Deportes Savio)
  Jocimar Nascimento (Motagua)
  Milton Núñez (Olimpia)
  Marcelo dos Santos (Platense)

4 goals

  Carlos Salinas (Atlético Olanchano)
  Sergio Diduch (Hispano)
  Henry Jiménez (Hispano)
  Allan do Santos (Olimpia)
  José Dias (Real España)
  Everaldo Ferreira (Real España)
  Carlos Fretes (Real España)
  Héctor Flores (Victoria)
  Johnny Calderón (Vida)

3 goals

  Wilmer Ramos (Atlético Olanchano)
  Harrison Róches (Deportes Savio)
  José Güity (Hispano)
  Carlos Oliva (Marathón)
  Óscar Torlacoff (Motagua)
  Reynaldo Tilguath (Olimpia)

2 goals

  Denilson Costa (Atlético Olanchano)
  Walter Hernández (Hispano)
  Rigoberto Padilla (Hispano)
  Milton Palacios (Marathón)
  Pedro Santana (Motagua)
  Danilo Turcios (Olimpia)
  Wilmer Velásquez (Olimpia)
  Quiarol Arzú (Platense)
  Bani Lozano (Platense)
  Marvin Sánchez (Platense)
  Douglas Caetano (Real España)
  Marlon Peña (Real España)
  Melvin Valladares (Real España)
  Marvin Chávez (Victoria)
  Jaime Rosales (Victoria)
  Jerry Bengtson (Vida)
  Ney Costa (Vida)
  Richard Pérez (Vida)

1 goal

  Jorge Lozano (Atlético Olanchano)
  Elmer Marín (Atlético Olanchano)
  Merlyn Membreño (Atlético Olanchano)
  Edgar Núñez (Atlético Olanchano)
  Guillermo Ramírez (Atlético Olanchano)
  Mario Euceda (Deportes Savio)
  Johny Galdámez (Deportes Savio)
  Edgar Mejía (Deportes Savio)
  Óscar Zepeda (Deportes Savio)
  Diktmar Hernández (Hispano)
  Mario Berríos (Marathon)
  Edmilson da Silva (Marathón)
  Astor Henríquez (Marathón)
  Luis López (Marathón)
  Erick Norales (Marathon)
  Luis Santamaría (Marathón)
  Erick Scott (Marathon)
  Víctor Bernárdez (Motagua)
  Fernando Castillo (Motagua)
  Walter López (Motagua)
  Rubén Matamoros (Motagua)
  Maynor Figueroa (Olimpia)
  Jerry Palacios (Olimpia)
  Hendry Thomas (Olimpia)
  David Meza (Platense)
  César Zelaya (Platense)
  Eddy Vega (Platense)
  Elkin González (Real España)
  Allan Lalín (Real España)
  Carlos Palacios (Real España)
  Fernando Cardozo (Victoria)
  Mario Gómez (Victoria)
  Júnior Izaguirre (Victoria)
  Ninrrol Medina (Victoria)
  Mauricio Weber (Victoria)
  Darian Álvarez (Vida)
  Borghi Arbizú (Vida)
  Miguel Farrera (Vida)
  Ángel Hill (Vida)
  Clifford Laing (Vida)
  Modesto Rodas (Vida)

Clausura
The Clausura tournament was played from 12 January to 24 May 2008. C.D. Olimpia captured its 21st domestic league.

Regular season

Standings

Results
 As of 3 May 2008

Final round

Semifinals

Olimpia vs Motagua

 Olimpia won 7–2 on aggregate score.

Marathón vs Real España

 Marathón 5–5 Real España on aggregate score; Marathón advanced on better regular season performance.

Final

Olimpia vs Marathón

 Olimpia won 2–1 on aggregate score.

Top goalscorers
10 goals
  Wilmer Velásquez (Olimpia)
9 goals
  Jocimar Nascimento (Motagua)
8 goals

  Edmilson da Silva (Marathón)
  Douglas Caetano (Real España)
  Claudio Cardozo (Vida)

6 goals
  Ney Costa (Deportes Savio)
5 goals

  Carlos Pavón (Real España)
  Eduardo Bennett (Atlético Olanchano)
  Oscar Torlacoff (Motagua)
  Andy Furtado (Marathón)

4 goals

  Marcelo Cabrita (Platense)
  Orvin Paz (Deportes Savio)
  Walter Hernández (Olimpia)
  Danilo Turcios (Olimpia)
  José Güity (Marathón)
  Henry Jiménez (Hispano)

3 goals

  Marcelo Ferreira (Marathón)
  Marvin Chávez (Victoria)
  Júnior Izaguirre (Victoria)
  Sergio Diduch (Hispano)
  Javier Portillo (Hispano)
  Marcelo Segales (Hispano)
  Johnny Calderón (Vida)
  Edgar Nuñez (Atlético Olanchano)
  Ramón Núñez (Olimpia)
  Ramiro Bruschi (Olimpia)
  Carlos Días (Real España)
  Allan Lalín (Real España)
  Carlos Will Mejía (Platense)
  Bani Lozano (Platense)

2 goals

  Elmer Marín (Atlético Olanchano)
  Henry Córdoba (Platense)
  Mario Berríos (Marathón)
  Carlos Oliva (Marathón)
  Astor Henríquez (Marathón)
  Eberso Amaral (Marathón)
  Rigoberto Padilla (Hispano)
  Milton Ruíz (Hispano)
  Avidán Solís (Victoria)
  Luis Rodas (Motagua)
  Fernando Castillo (Motagua)
  Víctor Bernárdez (Motagua)
  Rubén Matamoros (Motagua)
  Elkin González (Real España)
  Erick Vallecillo (Real España)
  Mario César Rodríguez (Real España)
  Allan Kardeck (Olimpia)
  Carlos Alberto Salinas (Atlético Olanchano)
  Richard Pérez (Atlético Olanchano)
  Dicktmar Hernández (Vida)
  José Luis Grant (Vida)
  Lenín Suárez (Deportes Savio)

1 goal

  José Regalado (Hispano)
  Jairo Mosquera (Hispano)
  Leonardo Morales (Hispano)
  Eliu Membreño (Hispano)
  Leonardo Isaula (Hispano)
  Samir Arzú (Atlético Olanchano)
  Wilmer Ramos (Atlético Olanchano)
  José Mario Navarro (Atlético Olanchano)
  José Valladares (Motagua)
  Emilio Izaguirre (Motagua)
  Amado Guevara (Motagua)
  Misael Ruíz (Platense)
  Adán Ramírez (Platense)
  Erick Norales (Marathón)
  Emil Martínez (Marathón)
  Nilberto da Silva (Marathón)
  Óscar Bonilla (Marathón)
  Reinieri Mayorquín (Marathón)
  Oscar Vargas (Marathón)
  Edilson Pereira (Deportes Savio)
  Harrison Róchez (Deportes Savio)
  Onán García (Deportes Savio)
  Víctor Ramírez (Deportes Savio)
  Juliano de Andrade (Deportes Savio)
  Carlos Morán (Victoria)
  Juan Pablo Montes (Victoria)
  Mauricio Weber (Victoria)
  Derrick Hulse (Victoria)
  Ninrrol Medina (Victoria)
  Carin Adipe (Victoria)
  Wilmer Crisanto (Victoria)
  Héctor Flores (Real España)
  Nery Medina (Real España)
  Carlos Fretes (Real España)
  Elder Valladares (Real España)
  Everaldo Ferreira (Real España)ç
  Nahún Ávila (Olimpia)
  Sergio Mendoza (Olimpia)
  Erick Andino (Olimpia)
  Carlos Discua (Olimpia)
  Boniek García (Olimpia)
  Juan Manuel Cárcamo (Olimpia)
  Hendry Thomas (Olimpia)
  Milton Núñez (Olimpia)
  Jerry Bengtson (Vida)
  Modesto Rodas (Vida)
  Angel Hill (Vida)

Aggregate table
Atlético Olanchano made the fewest points in the aggregated table from both Apertura and Clausura regular seasons, thereby were relegated to the Liga de Ascenso.

References

External links
 Official website

Liga Nacional de Fútbol Profesional de Honduras seasons
1
Honduras